Soledad Valley is a coastal valley in San Diego County, California at the northern end of the city of San Diego. Mention of the valley was made as early as 1850 in association with the occurrence of Pinus torreyana at the mouth of the lagoon. The colony of the endangered Torrey Pine divided by Soledad Valley is one of only two colonies of this tree in the world.

See also

 Del Mar, California

Line notes

References
 Science (1884) published by the American Association for the Advancement of Science, HighWire Press, JSTOR, Item notes: v.3 1884 January–June
 C.Michael Hogan (2008) Torrey Pine: Pinus torreyana, Globaltwitcher, ed. Nicklas Stromberg 

Valleys of San Diego County, California
Geography of San Diego